Trostre Sports A.F.C. are a Welsh football club from Trostre, Carmarthenshire  in West Wales. They currently play in the Carmarthenshire League Premier Division, and are the reigning divisional champions.

History

The club were formed after raising a team from the British Steel tinplate works. They are the most successful team in the league, having been top flight (first division/ premier division) champions fourteen times.

Honours

 Carmarthenshire League Division One/ Premier Division  - Champions (14): 1955–56; 1987–88; 1988–89; 1991–92; 1995–95; 1996–97; 1997–98; 1998–99; 2001–02; 2005–06; 2006–07; 2016–17, 2019–20, 2021–22
 Carmarthenshire League Division Two  - Champions (1): 1954–55 
 Carmarthenshire League Division Three  - Champions (2): 1972–73; 2011–12 
 Carmarthenshire Senior Cup - Winners (5):  2000–01; 2005–06; 2006–07; 2015–16, 2021–22
 T G Davies Cup - Winners (6): 1963–64; 1997–98; 2000–01; 2005–06; 2006–07; 2016–17
 Challenge Cup - Winners (2): 2011–12; 2013–14
 Darch Cup - Winners (2): 2001–02; 2005–06
 Darch Cup - Runners-Up: 2021–22 (reserves)
 J Stephens Cup - Winners (1): 2016–17 (reserves)
 West Wales Intermediate Cup – Winners: 1988–89
 West Wales Intermediate Cup – Runners-Up: 1986–87; 1991–92, 2021–22

References

External links
Official club Twitter

Football clubs in Wales
Sport in Carmarthenshire
Carmarthenshire League clubs
Association football clubs established in 1954
1954 establishments in Wales
Sport in Llanelli
Works association football teams in Wales